Beautiful Boxer is a 2003 Thai biographical sports film produced, directed and co-written by Ekachai Uekrongtham. It tells the life story of Parinya Charoenphol (a.k.a. Nong Toom), a famous kathoey, Muay Thai fighter, actress and model. Charoenphol was portrayed by male kickboxer Asanee Suwan.

Cast
 Asanee Suwan as Nong Toom / Parinya Charoenphol
 Sorapong Chatree as Pi Chart
 Orn-Anong Panyawong as Parinya Charoenphol's mother
 Nukkid Boonthong as Parinya Charoenphol's father
 Sitiporn Niyom as Nat
 Kyoko Inoue as herself (female Japanese wrestler)
 Sarawuth Tangchit as Parinya Charoenphol (as a child)
 Keagan Kang as Jack the reporter

Reception
On review aggregator website Rotten Tomatoes, the film has an approval rating of 81% based on 36 critics. The website's critical consensus reads: "Beautiful Boxer blends boxing and identity politics to create a striking, if overdrawn, portrait of self discovery."

There was controversy in Thailand about the full frontal nudity in this film. For the Thai release, the nudity was cut.

The movie was highlighted in the book Movies and Mental Illness: Using Films to Understand Psychopathology as a example of films focusing on Gender Dysphoria.

Awards and nominations
Won
 Torino International Gay & Lesbian Film Festival – Best Feature Film
 Thailand National Film Association Awards – Best Actor (Asanee Suwan), Best Makeup (Kraisorn Sampethchareon)
 San Sebastián International Film Festival – Sebastian Award
 Milan International Lesbian and Gay Film Festival – Best Film
 Outfest – Achievement Award – Outstanding Emerging Talent (Ekachai Uekrongtham)
Nominated
 GLAAD Media Awards – Outstanding Film

References

External links

 
 Official U.S. Site
 
 "Ladyboys: The Secret World of Thailand's Third Gender" by Susan Aldous and Pornchai Sereemongkonpol published 2008 by Maverick House Publishers

2003 films
2003 biographical drama films
2000s sports drama films
Thai biographical films
Thai LGBT-related films
Thai-language films
2000s English-language films
2000s Japanese-language films
Biographical films about sportspeople
Boxing films
Films about trans women
Sports films based on actual events
LGBT-related sports drama films
Muay Thai films
Thai Muay Thai films
Here TV original programming
Kathoey
Cultural depictions of Thai people
Cultural depictions of boxers
Cultural depictions of transgender people
2003 LGBT-related films
2003 drama films
Biographical films about LGBT people
2000s American films
Films set in Thailand